Agylla virago is a moth of the family Erebidae first described by Walter Rothschild in 1913. It is found in Taiwan.

The wingspan is 46–58 mm.

References

Moths described in 1913
virago
Moths of Taiwan